Asian Film Award for Best Supporting Actress has been awarded annually since 2008 by the Hong Kong International Film Festival Society.

Winners and nominees

2000s

2010s

2020s

References

External links
 Official site

Asian Film Awards
 
Film awards for supporting actress